The Sadyr Japarov III government has governed Kyrgyzstan since 13 October 2021.

Ministers 

 Chairman of the Cabinet of Ministers – Ulukbek Maripov.
 First Deputy Chairman – Artyom Novikov
 Deputy Chairman — Ulukbek Karymshakov
 Minister of Economy and Finance – Ulukbek Karymshakov
 Minister of Defense – Taalaibek Omuraliev
 Minister of Foreign Affairs – Ruslan Kazakbayev
 Minister of Justice – Asel Chinbayeva
 Minister of Internal Affairs – Ulan Niyazbekov
 Minister of Education and Science – Almazbek Beyshenaliev
 Minister of Health and Social Development – Alymkadyr Beyshenaliev
 Minister of Transportation, Architecture, Construction and Communication – Gulmira Abdralieva
 Minister of Energy and Industry – Kubanychbek Turdubayev
 Minister of Agriculture, Water Resources and Regional Development – Askarbek Janybekov
 Minister of Emergency Situations – Boobek Ajikeev
 Minister of Culture, Information, Sports and Youth Policy – Kayrat Iymanaliev
 Chairman of the State Committee for National Security – Kamchybek Tashiev

 Head of the Government Office — Jenishbek Asankulov, Minister of Economy and Finance.

References 

Government of Kyrgyzstan
2021 establishments in Asia
Cabinets established in 2021
Current governments